Dimow is a Medium-sized village in Sissiborgaon tehsil, Dhemaji district in the Indian state of Assam. It is situated at a distance of 48 km from its district headquarters Dhemaji and 16 km from nearest town Silapathar.

Demographics 
As per 2011 census the total population of the village is 731 out of which 403 are males while 328 are females. The average sex ratio of the village is 814 which is lower than the state average of 958. As of 2011, literacy rate of the village was 70.55% compared to state average of 72.19%. Male literacy stands at 82.81% while female literacy rate was at 55.59%.

Banking Service
 Assam Gramin Vikash Bank Dimow Branch
 SBI CSP, Dimow (Kulajan Branch)

Transportation 
Currently NH-52 is well connected to Dimow from other towns of the states and also connecting it with Towns and cities of Assam and Arunachal Pradesh with nearest city being Silapathar sharing its pincode and postal office.
Lilabari airport which falls under the town of Lakhimpur district is the nearest airport from Dimow.

Education 

Schools

Dimow has a number of educational institutions:-
 Chimenmukh Higher Secondary School, Dimow which was established in 1970 which is now the oldest school of the region.
 Don Bosco Society School, Dimow is a private English medium school which was established in 1998.
 Diamond English School, Dimow
 Sankardev Shishu Vidya Niketan, Dimow.
 LMT Public School, Dimow
Colleges

 Dimow Charali/Junior College, Dimow. 
Dhemaji polytechnic college is situated about 7 km away at Simenchapori.

Economy 
Agriculture is the main profession for most of the people in the village.

References

Villages in Dhemaji district